Bulmer Cavern is New Zealand's longest cave system, running for  through Mount Owen in the Tasman region of the northwest South Island. John Patterson discovered the cave on New Year's Day 1984, by dropping a rock down and counting the seconds until it reached the bottom.

Bulmer Cavern was the location of a major cave rescue effort in 1998, when it took 80 cavers several days to extract another caver who had fallen and broken his jaw deep in the cavern.

References

External links
Caving areas in New Zealand

Caves of the Tasman District